Krokus may refer to:

 Krokus (band), a hard rock/heavy metal band from Switzerland
 Krokus (album), 1976 self-titled debut album by Krokus
 Krokus (mythology), a companion of Hermes in Classical mythology

See also

 Crocus, a genus of perennial flowering plants
 Chrocus, a 3rd-century Alamanni leader
 CROCUS, a nuclear reactor operated by the École polytechnique fédérale de Lausanne